Karl May film adaptations are films based on stories and characters by German author Karl May (1842–1912). The characters Old Shatterhand, Winnetou, and Kara Ben Nemsi are very famous in Central Europe.

In most of the film versions the novels were reworked to a great extent, some movies using only the names of characters invented by Karl May. For example, in the book Der Schatz im Silbersee (The Treasure of Silver Lake) the main character was called "Old Firehand" – in the movie he  was renamed "Old Shatterhand" (played by American actor Lex Barker) after the more famous character. The movies Old Shatterhand (Apaches' Last Battle) and Winnetou and Old Firehand (Thunder at the Border) are not based on any of May's works, but were completely invented by the screenwriters. Several TV productions, such as Das Buschgespenst and Kara Ben Nemsi Effendi, were much closer to the novels.

In foreign distribution, most of the movie titles were not translated directly into the target language, but new movie titles were made up. For American distribution the makers of the movie posters also invented some new color formats such as Flaming Arrow Color for the movie Der Schatz im Silbersee  and Apache Color  for Winnetou 1. Teil (called Apache Gold in America).

The silent movies of the 1920s are now probably lost.

For 10 movies in the 1960s, German composer Martin Böttcher wrote landmark film scores, whose success also helped the movies' international success and influenced the Italian movie industry to make Western movies of their own and create a whole new genre, the Spaghetti Western (whose most successful composer Ennio Morricone came to fame just after Martin Böttcher).

Michael Herbig's 2001 film Der Schuh des Manitu satirized the Karl May films of the 1960s to great commercial success in Germany.

Theatrical films 
 Auf den Trümmern des Paradieses (–) (On the Brink of Paradise) (1920), dir.: Josef Stein (silent film)
 Die Todeskarawane (Caravan of Death) (1920), dir.: Josef Stein (silent)
 Die Teufelsanbeter (The Devil Worshippers, informal) (1920), dir.: Ertugrul Moussin-Bey (silent)
 Durch die Wüste (Across the Desert) (1936), dir.: Johannes Alexander Hübler-Kahla (first sound film)
  (–) (1958), dir.: Georg Marischka / Ramón Torrado (first color film)
  (–) (1959), dir.: Johannes Kai (= Hanns Wiedmann) / Ramón Torrado
 Der Schatz im Silbersee (Treasure of the Silver Lake) (1962), dir.: Dr. Harald Reinl
 Winnetou 1. Teil (Apache Gold) (1963), dir.: Dr. Harald Reinl
 Old Shatterhand (Apaches' Last Battle) (1964), dir.: Hugo Fregonese
  (Yellow Devil a.k.a. The Shoot) (1964), dir.: Robert Siodmak
 Winnetou – 2. Teil (Last of the Renegades) (1964), dir.: Dr. Harald Reinl
 Unter Geiern (Frontier Hellcat a.k.a. Among Vultures) (1964), dir.: Alfred Vohrer
 Der Schatz der Azteken (The Treasure of the Aztecs) (1965), dir.: Robert Siodmak
 Die Pyramide des Sonnengottes (Pyramid of the Sun God) (1965), dir.: Robert Siodmak
 Der Ölprinz (Rampage at Apache Wells) (1965), dir.: Harald Philipp
  (Wild Kurdistan a.k.a. The Wild Men of Kurdistan) (1965), dir.: Franz Joseph Gottlieb
 Winnetou – 3. Teil (The Desperado Trail) (1965), dir.: Dr. Harald Reinl
 Old Surehand 1. Teil (Flaming Frontier) (1965), dir.: Alfred Vohrer
  (Kingdom of the Silver Lion a.k.a. Fury of the Sabers) (1965), dir.: Franz Joseph Gottlieb
 Das Vermächtnis des Inka (Legacy of the Incas) (1965), dir.: Georg Marischka
 Winnetou und das Halbblut Apanatschi (Winnetou and the Crossbreed) (1966), dir.: Harald Philipp
 Winnetou und sein Freund Old Firehand (Winnetou and Old Firehand a.k.a. Thunder at the Border) (1966), dir: Alfred Vohrer
 Winnetou und Shatterhand im Tal der Toten (The Valley of Death) (1968), dir.: Dr. Harald Reinl
 Der Schuh des Manitu (The Shoe of the Manitou) (2001), dir.: Michael Herbig
 Bullyparade – Der Film (Bullyparade – The Movie) (2017), dir.: Michael Herbig

Television 

 Mit Karl May im Orient – 1963, 6 episodes
 Kara Ben Nemsi Effendi – 1973/75, 26 episodes
 Mein Freund Winnetou (My Friend Winnetou – French: Winnetou le Mescalero) – 1980, 14 episodes
  – 1986, 2 episodes
  – 1988, 2 episodes
  – 1998, 2 episodes
 WinneToons (German animated series) – 26 episodes
 Winnetou – Der Mythos lebt – 2016, 3 episodes

Discography 

 "Wilder Westen – Heißer Orient" – Karl-May-Filmmusik 1936–1968
 Bear Family Records BCD 16413 HL – 8 CDs with 192-page movie-book

 "Winnetou Melodie – Martin Böttcher dirigiert seine großen Karl-May-Erfolge" (1971/1991)
  Convoy (East West Records, Time Warner, distributed by Karussel Musik and Video GmbH,  849 824-2)

Literature 

 Michael Petzel: Karl May Filmbuch, Karl-May-Verlag, Bamberg,

References

External links 

 Mondo-Esoterica.net – reviews (in English) of the 1960s Karl May films and their DVD releases
 Rialto Film The website of Rialto Film, who produced many of the Karl May films

 
German film series